The 1981 Indiana State Sycamores football team was an American football team that represented Indiana State University as a member of the Missouri Valley Conference during the 1981 NCAA Division I-A football season. In their second year under head coach Dennis Raetz, the team compiled a 5–5–1 record (2–4–1 in the MVC).

Schedule

References

Indiana State
Indiana State Sycamores football seasons
Indiana State Sycamores football